Parajubaea torallyi, commonly known as the palma de Pasobaya or Bolivian mountain coconut, is a species of evergreen flowering plant of genus Parajubaea, in the family Arecaceae, closely related to the coconut palm in the tribe Cocoseae.

It is cultivated for its stunning ornamental properties united to its cold hardiness.

In cultivation it prefers a mild or cool climate without extremes of temperature and a neutral to acidic soil, and it tolerates droughts but not excess of water.

It is now an endangered species, threatened by habitat loss.

Description
Parajubaea torallyi can be over 13 meters in height.  It can withstand temperatures of -13 degrees Celsius (9 degrees Fahrenheit). The fruits, or cocos, grow 5–10 cm in diameter in clusters weighing up to 15 kg.

References

External links

torallyi
Endemic flora of Bolivia
Flora of the Andes
Endangered plants
Taxonomy articles created by Polbot